The 1968–69 season was the 89th season of competitive football by Rangers.

Overview
Rangers played a total of 55 competitive matches during the 1968–69 season.

Forward Willie Johnston finished as Rangers Top Goalscorer with 28 goals (inc. Glasgow Cup games). Seven of his goals were scored at Ibrox Stadium, eight were scored at Parkhead. A brace in a 4–2 league win v Celtic 14 September was followed on 21 March with a hat-trick against Aberdeen in a 6–1 Scottish Cup tie. Three weeks later he returned to Parkhead on 11 April for a Glasgow Cup tie against Celtic and netted 3 more in a 4–3 victory. His eight goals there during the season resulted in him scoring more at Parkhead than Celtic's 2nd all-time top scorer Bobby Lennox.

Colin Stein was signed in a £100,000 Scottish record transfer deal from Hibernian on 31 October. His first three games for the club saw him score 3 (Arbroath 5–1),3 (Hibs 6–1) & 2 (Dundalk 3–0) in just eleven days.

Results
All results are written with Rangers' score first.

Scottish First Division
 * Colin Stein Rangers debut match

Inter-Cities Fairs Cup

Scottish Cup 
 **Alex Ferguson final match

League Cup

See also
 1968–69 in Scottish football
 1968–69 Scottish Cup
 1968–69 Scottish League Cup
 1968–69 Inter-Cities Fairs Cup

References 

Rangers F.C. seasons
Rangers
Rangers